HEAT is an international Australian literary magazine published by Giramondo Publishing, an independent publisher based at Western Sydney University.

History 
HEAT has been produced in three distinct series. The was first published in July 1996, with an initial series of 15 issues that ran until 2000. A second series of 24 issues began in 2001 and ended in 2011. A third series commenced publication in February 2022.

Staff 
The first two series of HEAT were edited by Ivor Indyk and designed by Toni Hope-Catten and Harry Williamson. The third series is edited by Alexandra Christie and designed by Jenny Grigg. 

Notable contributors have included Aravind Adiga, Roberto Bolaño, Murray Bail, John Berger, Brian Castro, Inga Clendinnen, Helen Garner, Gail Jones, Etgar Keret, David Malouf, Les Murray, Dorothy Porter, Charles Simic, Susan Sontag, Paul Virilio, Eliot Weinberger, and Tim Winton.

References

External links 
 
 Giramondo Publishing website
 The Australian review of HEAT's final issue
 Profile of publisher Ivor Indyk

1996 establishments in Australia
2011 disestablishments in Australia
Defunct literary magazines published in Australia
Magazines established in 1996
Magazines disestablished in 2011
Western Sydney University
Magazines published in Sydney